The Trinidad and Tobago Super League Cup, or commonly known as the CFTL League Cup for sponsorship reasons, is the league cup style football competition open for Trinidad and Tobago teams competing in the country's TT Super League. It is played on a knockout (single elimination) basis from September to November.

Format

Sponsorship
The League Cup's sponsor was CFTL for 2017, however this will be the only year they will sponsor the League Cup as they failed to pay the winners Guaya United TT$.5m contract.

Finals

Results

References

External links
Official Website

Football cup competitions in Trinidad and Tobago
2004 in Trinidad and Tobago sport